Gallina is a census-designated place  in Rio Arriba County, New Mexico, United States. Its population was 286 as of the 2010 census. Gallina has a post office with ZIP code 87017. New Mexico State Road 96 passes through the community.

Gallina is derived from the Spanish word gallina, meaning "hen", and used figuratively to denote a coward.

Demographics

References

Census-designated places in New Mexico
Census-designated places in Rio Arriba County, New Mexico